Jonathan Haggerty (born 18 February 1997) is a British Muay Thai fighter currently signed with ONE Championship. He is a former ONE Flyweight Muay Thai World Champion. As of March 6, 2023, he is ranked #5 in the ONE Bantamweight Muay Thai rankings.

Background
Haggerty grew up in Walworth Road, London, with a younger brother and two younger sisters. He learned Muay Thai from his father at the age of 7, and he started competing as an amateur at the age of 12.

Muay Thai career

Early career
Haggerty made his professional debut in 2014, against Anthony Edwards, winning the fight by a fourth round TKO. He would win his next four fights by stoppage, before fighting Gery Bavetta at Muaythai Mayhem for the ISKA World Super-Featherweight Muay Thai title. He defeated Bavetta by a third round knockout.

In his next two fights, Haggerty defeated Geo Marchese and James O'Connell by a first round stoppage. He suffered his first professional loss during Yokkao 28, losing a decision to Ja Kiatphontip. He rebounded with a second round knockout of Keith McLachlan at Yokkao 29. He was scheduled to fight Liam Harrison at Yokkao 31, but the fight would later fall through. Harrison was replaced by Superlek Kiatmuu9, with Superlek winning by TKO. Before appearing at Yokkao 31, Haggerty won the WBC Muaythai Super Featherweight International title with a TKO of Isaac Araya.

ONE Championship
Haggerty made his ONE Championship debut in January 2019 and defeated Joseph Lasiri via unanimous decision.

On 4 May 2019 he defeated the legendary Sam-A Gaiyanghadao at ONE Championship: For Honor to claim the ONE Flyweight Muay Thai World Championship.

Immediately after receiving the belt he called out Thai boxing phenom Rodtang Jitmuangnon against whom he would make his first title defence. The bout took place on 2 August 2019, with Haggerty losing the ONE Flyweight Muay Thai World Championship to Jitmuangnon at ONE Championship: Dawn of Heroes.

Jonathan Haggerty eventually faced Rodtang in a rematch for the ONE Muay Thai title at ONE Championship: A New Tomorrow on 10 January 2020. He was knocked down in the opening round and was dominated for the remainder of the fight, losing by TKO in the third round after being knocked down three times in the round.

Haggerty's next fight was against the Japanese opponent Taiki Naito at ONE Championship: Big Bang 2. He won the fight by unanimous decision, scoring a knockdown in both the first and the second round.

Haggerty was scheduled to face former ONE Flyweight Kickboxing world title challenger Elias Mahmoudi at ONE on TNT 4 on 28 April 2021. Their fight was cancelled due to COVID-19 travel restrictions and Haggerty was unable to make it to the bout.

Haggery faced Arthur Meyer for the ISKA Muay Thai Lightweight World title at Siam Warriors Superfights on 20 November 2021. He won the fight by a second-round knockout.

Haggerty faced Mongkolpetch Petchyindee Academy at ONE: Bad Blood on 11 February 2022. He won the bout via unanimous decision and was awarded a Performance of the Night bonus.

Haggerty was booked to face Walter Goncalves in the quarterfinals of the ONE Muay Thai Flyweight Grand Prix at ONE 157 on 20 May 2022. However, close to the fight Haggerty pulled out of the fight citing health reasons and was replaced by Josue Cruz.

Haggerty was expected to face Amir Naseri in a ONE Muay Thai Flyweight Grand Prix alternate bout at ONE on Prime Video 1 on August 27, 2022. He withdrew from the fight due to a non-COVID related illness on August 24.

Haggerty revealed that he had been considering a move into MMA with the promotion ahead of his ONE on Prime Video 4 bout, saying "I think that's what they're going to expect me to do like you said, but I feel like the wrestling, the jujitsu, etc, is getting so much better in the UK. You know, people flying abroad to get the work in, and yeah, people are just going to try and take me down, and hopefully, they just walk into a knee.

Haggerty faced Vladimir Kuzmin on November 19, 2022, at ONE on Prime Video 4. At weigh-ins, Haggerty weigh in at 148 lbs, 3 pounds over the limit. The bout continued at a catchweight and Haggerty being fined 20% of his purse, which went to his opponent Kuzmin. He won the fight via majority decision.

Haggerty is scheduled to face Nong-O Gaiyanghadao for the ONE Bantamweight Muay Thai World Championship on April 22, 2023, at ONE Fight Night 9.

Titles And accomplishments
 ONE Championship
 ONE Flyweight Muay Thai World Champion (one time; former)
 Performance of the Night (one time) vs. Mongkolpetch Petchyindee
 WBC Muaythai 
 2018 WBC Muaythai International Super Featherweight Champion.
 International Sport Karate Association 
 2016 ISKA Muay Thai World Super Featherweight Champion
 2021 ISKA Muay Thai World Lightweight Champion
 Roar Combat League
 2017 Roar Combat League World Champion

Muay Thai record

|-  style="background:#;"
| 2023-04-22 ||   ||align=left| Nong-O Gaiyanghadao ||  ONE Fight Night 9 ||  ||   ||   || 
|-
! style=background:white colspan=9 |

|-  style="background:#cfc;"
| 2022-11-19|| Win ||align=left| Vladimir Kuzmin || ONE on Prime Video 4 || Kallang, Singapore || Decision (Majority)  ||3  ||3:00 

|-  style="background:#cfc;"
| 2022-02-11|| Win ||align=left| Mongkolpetch Petchyindee Academy || ONE: Bad Blood ||Kallang, Singapore || Decision (Unanimous) || 3 || 3:00
|-  style="background:#cfc;"
| 2021-11-20|| Win ||align=left| Arthur Meyer ||  Siam Warriors Superfights || Dublin, Ireland || KO (Left hook + right cross) || 2 || 1:00 
|-
! style=background:white colspan=9 |

|-  style="background:#cfc;"
| 2020-12-04|| Win ||align=left| Taiki Naito ||  |ONE Championship: Big Bang 2 || Kallang, Singapore || Decision (Unanimous) || 3 || 3:00
|-  style="background:#fbb;"
| 2020-01-10|| Loss ||align=left| Rodtang Jitmuangnon || ONE Championship: A New Tomorrow || Bangkok, Thailand || TKO (3 Knockdowns/Body Punches) || 3 || 2:39   
|-
! style=background:white colspan=9 |
|-  style="background:#fbb;"
| 2019-08-02|| Loss ||align=left| Rodtang Jitmuangnon || ONE Championship: Dawn of Heroes || Manila, Philippines || Decision (Unanimous) || 5 ||  3:00
|-
! style=background:white colspan=9 |
|-  style="background:#cfc;"
| 2019-05-04|| Win ||align=left| Sam-A Gaiyanghadao || ONE Championship: For Honor || Jakarta, Indonesia || Decision (Unanimous) || 5 || 3:00 
|-
! style=background:white colspan=9 |
|-  style="background:#cfc;"
| 2019-01-18|| Win ||align=left| Joseph Lasiri || ONE Championship: Eternal Glory || Jakarta, Indonesia || Decision (Unanimous) || 3 || 3:00
|-  style="background:#fbb;"
| 2018-10-13|| Loss ||align=left| Superlek Kiatmuu9|| Yokkao 31 & 32 ||United Kingdom || TKO (Doctor Stoppage/Cut)|| 2 || 3:00
|-  style="background:#cfc;"
| 2018-05-26|| Win ||align=left| Isaac Araya || MuayThai Mayhem || United Kingdom || TKO  || 2 || 2:10 
|-
! style=background:white colspan=9 |
|-  style="background:#cfc;"
| 2018-03-10|| Win ||align=left| Keith McLachlan || YOKKAO 29 || Bolton, England || KO (Left High Kick) || 2 || 0:15
|-  style="background:#fbb;"
| 2017-10-15|| Loss ||align=left| Ja Kiatphontip || YOKKAO 28 || Bolton, England || Decision || 5 || 3:00
|-  style="background:#cfc;"
| 2017-02-11|| Win ||align=left| James O'Connell || Roar Combat League 5|| Bolton, England || KO (Head kick) || 1 || 0:20
|-  style="background:#cfc;"
| 2016-09-03|| Win ||align=left| Geo Marchese || UCMMA 48 || London, England || KO || 1 ||
|-  style="background:#cfc;"
| 2016-04-15|| Win ||align=left| Gery Bavetta || Muaythai Mayhem || United Kingdom || KO || 3 || 
|-
! style=background:white colspan=9 |
|-  style="background:#cfc;"
| 2015-06-20|| Win ||align=left| Ross Cochrane || MTGP 1 || London, England || KO || 1 ||
|-  style="background:#cfc;"
| 2014-11-08|| Win ||align=left| Juan Jesús Antunez || WBC Muaythai international challenge || England || KO || 2 ||
|-  style="background:#cfc;"
| 2014-06-17|| Win ||align=left| || Chaweng Muay Thai Boxing Stadium || Koh Samui, Thailand || KO (Elbow) || 3 ||
|-  style="background:#cfc;"
| 2014-04-14|| Win ||align=left| || Chaweng Muay Thai Boxing Stadium || Koh Samui, Thailand || KO (Right high kick) || 1 ||
|-  style="background:#cfc;"
| 2014|| Win ||align=left| Anthony Edwards ||  || England || TKO (Doctor Stoppage) || 4 || 
|-
| colspan=9 | Legend:

See also
 List of male kickboxers
 List of ONE Championship champions

References

1997 births
Living people
Bantamweight kickboxers
English Muay Thai practitioners
People from Orpington
Sportspeople from London
ONE Championship kickboxers
ONE Championship champions